Vivien Joan Johnson (born 1949) is an Australian sociologist, writer on Indigenous Australian art, and former editor-in-chief of the Dictionary of Australian Artists Online.

Johnson is notable for the publication of several key reference works in the field of contemporary Indigenous Australian art, including Western Desert Artists: A Biographical Dictionary (1995), Lives of the Papunya Tula Artists (2008) and Once Upon a Time in Papunya (2010).

In 2005 she was made Professor of New Media Narrative and Theory at the University of New South Wales.  she is Adjunct Art and Design Professor.

She was a longtime friend of artist Kumantje Jagamara, and spoke at his funeral in March 2021.

References

1949 births
Living people
Australian Aboriginal art
Australian sociologists
Australian women sociologists